The Republic of the Congo elects on the national level a head of state – the president – and a legislature. The president is elected by the people. The Parliament (Parlement) has two chambers. The National Assembly (Assemblée Nationale) has 153 members, for a five-year term in single-seat constituencies. The Senate (Sénat) has 66 members, elected for a six-year term by district, local and regional councils. The Republic of Congo is a one party dominant state with the Congolese Labour Party in power. Opposition parties are allowed, but are widely considered to have no real chance of gaining power.

Elections are governed by Congo's election law, most recently modified in 2016.

Latest elections

Presidential elections

Parliamentary elections

See also
Electoral calendar
Electoral system

External links
Adam Carr's Election Archive
African Elections Database